Korean embassy may refer to:

List of diplomatic missions of North Korea
List of diplomatic missions of South Korea